Jasmina Đokić (anglicized as "Jasmina Djokic") is a Serbian painter. She lives and works in Kruševac. She graduated at the Faculty of Fine Arts, University of Belgrade, in the painting department in 1997 in the class of professor Momcilo Antonović. Master studies completed on the same faculty in the class of professor Zoran Vuković. She had 3 independent exhibitions (Belgrade, Kraljevo, Kruševac). She participated at several international group exhibitions in the country and abroad, as well as art colonies.

Major group exhibitions 

 1996 - International Exhibition mail'art 'Crazy Cats and Fantastic', Pisa, Italy
 1996 - The first international biennial exhibition of a small size 'Międzynarodowe Raciborz Biennale'96', Raciborz, Poland
 1996 - Small form art gallery, Kruševac
 1997 - 3rd International Electrografphic Art Exhibition'97 Pisa, Pisa, Italy
 1997 - Mail Art Project: The Songs's Routes', Ravenna, Italy
 1998 - The second international biennial exhibition of a small size 'II Miedzinarodowe Biennale Raciborz'98', Raciborz, Poland
 1998 - Fifth International Biennial miniature art, Gornji Milanovac
 2000 - 3rd International Biennial Exhibition of a small size 'Międzynarodowe Raciborz Raciborz Biennale, Poland
 2000 - Second International Christian Art Show, Seaside Art Gallery, Nags Head, North Carolina, United States 
 2000 - Eighth International Miniature Art Show, Seaside Art Gallery, Nags Head, North Carolina, United States
 2000 - Second Biennial art and applied art, Smederevo
 2000 - Sixth International Biennial miniature art, Gornji Milanovac
 2000 - Artists manastiru Žiči, City Pinakoteka, Thessaloniki, Greece
 2003 - Seventh International Biennial miniature art, Gornji Milanovac

References 

Serbian painters
Modern painters
Living people
University of Belgrade alumni
Serbian women painters
20th-century women artists
1970 births